Papekop is a village in the Dutch province of Utrecht. It is a part of the municipality of Oudewater, and lies about 3 km northwest of the city of Oudewater.

Papekop was a separate municipality between 1818 and 1964, when it merged with Driebruggen. Between 1821 and 1989, when it became part of Oudewater, the village was located in the province of South Holland.

The village was first mentioned around 1307 as Papencoip, and means "(peat) concession of Pape (probably a clergy)". In 1840, it was home to 284 people. Between 1858 and 1936, there was a railway station in Papekop.

Gallery

References

Former municipalities of South Holland
Populated places in Utrecht (province)
Oudewater